The Ministry of Villages, Development of Disadvantaged Regions, and Transmigration (abbreviated as Kemendesa PDTT) is a government ministry in charge for assisting the President in regards to developing the rural and disadvantages areas in Indonesia. Through its community development, it would help to speed up the development of villages. It's also the responsible for the Transmigration Program.

History 
Development of disadvantaged regions programs was started under Abdurrahman Wahid presidency. At that time, the post of Undersecretariat of Acceleration of Development in Eastern Indonesia Affairs of the Republic of Indonesia (Indonesia: Menteri Muda Urusan Percepatan Pembangunan Kawasan Timur Indonesia Republik Indonesia) created by him thru Presidential Decision No. 234/M/2000 on reformation of National Unity Cabinet after first reshuffle of his cabinet 23 August 2000. Unlike undersecretary which normally positioned under a ministry in another countries, the undersecretariat office was directly under the President and this situation commonly happened in Indonesia up until prior Megawati Soekarnoputri presidency. The office firstly held by Manuel Kaisiepo [id]. Despite being under the President, the office does not have certain degree of freedom on its own. For financing the undersecretariat activities, the office was financed through Coordinating Ministry for Economic Affairs fund as written in the undersecretariat constituting document, Presidential Decree No. 164/2000. For program planning and execution, the office must be under Coordinating Ministry for Political, Legal, and Security Affairs supervision and gaining approval from Ministry of State Apparatus Utilization and Bureaucratic Reform as mandated in Presidential Decree No. 176/2000.

After Megawati Soekarnoputri took the presidency, the post retained by Manuel Kaisiepo, and the office elevated to State Ministry for the Acceleration of Development in Eastern Indonesia (Indonesia: Kementerian Negara Percepatan Pembangunan Kawasan Timur Indonesia). When Susilo Bambang Yudhoyono took the presidency after 2004 Indonesian presidential election, the  office later upgraded to the State Ministry for the Acceleration of Development of Disadvantaged Regions (Indonesia: Kementerian Negara Percepatan Pembangunan Daerah Tertinggal), and the office of the ministry retained the name until 9 May 2007 with Saifullah Yusuf as the minister. Since then, the office not only covered the Eastern Indonesia but whole disadvantaged regions of Indonesia. The ministry renamed into the State Ministry for the Development of Disadvantaged Regions (Indonesia: Kementerian Negara Pembangunan Daerah Tertinggal) and retained its name until 20 October 2009. During the second presidency of Susilo Bambang Yudhoyono, the office renamed into Ministry for the Development of Disadvantaged Regions (Indonesia: Kementerian Pembangunan Daerah Tertinggal) on 19 October 2011.

When Joko Widodo took the presidency after 2014 Indonesian presidential election, the ministry structure later expanded by combining the Ministry for the Development of Disadvantaged Regions and Directorate General of Guidance and Development of Transmigration Areas of Ministry of Manpower and changed its name to Ministry of Villages, Development of Disadvantaged Regions, and Transmigration.

Events 

19 October 2015 - Minister Marwan Jafar launched the Developing Villages Index (IDM)

6 November 2018 - Minister Eko Putro Sandjojo announced that the 2019 village funds would be "prioritized for use in community empowerment activities, village economy, and village innovation".

Organization Structure 
Based on the President Decree No. 85/2020 and as expanded with Ministry of Villages, Development of Disadvantaged Regions, and Transmigration Decree No. 15/2020 and Ministry of Villages, Development of Disadvantaged Regions, and Transmigration Decree No. 22/2020, the ministry consisted of:

 Office of the Minister of Villages, Development of Disadvantaged Regions, and Transmigration
 Office of the Deputy Minister of Villages, Development of Disadvantaged Regions, and Transmigration
 General Secretariat
 Bureau of Planning and Cooperation
 Bureau of Finance and State-Owned Assets
 Bureau of Employment and Organization
 Bureau of Public Relation
 Bureau of Legal Affairs
 Bureau of General Affairs and Procurement
 General Directorate of Villages and Rural Development (GID I)
 General Directorate of Villages and Rural Development Secretariat
 Directorate of Technical Planning for Villages and Rural Development
 Directorate of Infrastructure Development for Villages and Rural Areas
 Directorate of Social, Cultural, Environment for Villages and Rural Areas
 Directorate of Advocation and Cooperation of Villages and Rural Areas
 Directorate of Facilitation of Utilization of Village Fund
 General Directorate of Economy Development and Investments in Villages, Disadvantaged Regions, and Transmigration Areas (GID II)
 General Directorate of Economy Development and Investments in Village, Disadvantaged Regions, and Transmigration Areas Secretariat
 Directorate of Technical Planning for Economy Development and Investments
 Directorate of Economy and Investment Institutional Development 
 Directorate of Investment Services
 Directorate of Local Featured Products Development
 Directorate of Promotion and Marketing of Local Featured Products
 General Directorate of Acceleration of Disadvantaged Regions Development (GID III)
 General Directorate of Acceleration of Disadvantaged Regions Development Secretariat
 Directorate of Harmonization of Acceleration of Disadvantaged Regions Development Planning and Programs
 Directorate of Harmonization of Social, Cultural, and Institutional Development in Disadvantaged Regions
 Directorate of Harmonization of Infrastructure Development in Disadvantaged Regions
 Directorate of Harmonization of Natural Resources and Environmental Utilization in Disadvantaged Regions
 Directorate of Harmonization of Scheduled Areas Development
 General Directorate of Construction and Development of Transmigration Areas (GID IV)
 General Directorate of Construction and Development of Transmigration Areas Secretariat
 Directorate of Planning for Materialization of Transmigration Areas
 Directorate of Construction of Transmigration Areas
 Directorate of Facilitation and Management of Population Distribution in Transmigration Areas
 Directorate of Development of Settlement Units and Central Development Unit in Transmigration Areas
 Directorate of Development of Transmigration Areas
 General Inspectorate
 Office of the General Inspectorate
 Office of the General Inspectorate Secretariat
 Inspectorate I (overseeing General Secretariat and Agency for Human Resources Development and Community Empowerment of Villages, Disadvantaged Regions, and Transmigration activities)
 Inspectorate II (overseeing GID II and GID III activities)
 Inspectorate III (overseeing GID IV and Agency for Development and Information of Villages, Development of Disadvantaged Regions, and Transmigration activities)
 Inspectorate IV (overseeing GID I and General Inspectorate activities)
 Inspectorate V (coordinating and investigating issues related to Village Fund and misuses, and performing special investigations)
 Agency for Human Resources Development and Community Empowerment of Villages, Disadvantaged Regions, and Transmigration
 Center for Community Empowerment in Villages, Disadvantaged Regions, and Transmigration Areas
 Center for Human Resource Training for Villages, Disadvantaged Regions, and Transmigration
 Center for the Ministerial State Civil Servants Training 
 Center for Functionaries Fostering and Development   
 Indonesian Institute for Training and Empowerment of Public Community in Villages and Disadvantaged Regions and Transmigration, Jakarta
 Indonesian Institute for Training and Empowerment of Public Community in Villages and Disadvantaged Regions and Transmigration, Yogyakarta
 Institute for Training and Empowerment of Public Community in Villages and Disadvantaged Regions and Transmigration, Makassar
 Institute for Training and Empowerment of Public Community in Villages and Disadvantaged Regions and Transmigration, Banjarmasin
 Institute for Training and Empowerment of Public Community in Villages and Disadvantaged Regions and Transmigration, Pekanbaru
 Institute for Training and Empowerment of Public Community in Villages and Disadvantaged Regions and Transmigration, Ambon
 Institute for Training and Empowerment of Public Community in Villages and Disadvantaged Regions and Transmigration, Jayapura
 Institute for Training and Empowerment of Public Community in Villages and Disadvantaged Regions and Transmigration, Denpasar
 Institute for Training and Empowerment of Public Community in Villages and Disadvantaged Regions and Transmigration, Bengkulu
 Agency for Development and Information of Villages, Development of Disadvantaged Regions, and Transmigration
 Center for Villages, Development of Disadvantaged Regions, and Transmigration Policy Development
 Center for Villages, Disadvantaged Regions, and Transmigration Areas Competitive Development
 Center for Integrative Development Plans Formulation for Villages, Development of Disadvantaged Regions, and Transmigration
 Center for Data and Information for Villages Development, Development of Disadvantaged Regions, and Transmigration
 Expert Staffs
 Expert Staffs of Development and Community
 Expert Staffs of Local Economy Development
 Expert Staffs of Areal Development
 Expert Staffs of Inter-Institutional Relations
 Expert Staffs of Laws and Bureaucracy Reform

Ministers

References

External links 

Government ministries of Indonesia